Two methods of preparing fish or meat in Japanese cuisine are called  or . In Japanese,  means "pounded" or "hit into pieces".

Cooked food
In the first  method, the meat or fish is seared very briefly over a hot flame or in a pan, and can be briefly marinated in vinegar, sliced thin, and seasoned with ginger (which is ground or pounded into a paste, hence the name). Food so prepared can also be served like sashimi with soy sauce and garnishes.

The method originated in Tosa Province, now part of Kōchi Prefecture, where it was applied to bonito. Lore has it that it was developed by Sakamoto Ryōma, a 19th-century rebel samurai, who picked up the European technique of grilling meat from the foreigners resident in Nagasaki.

Uncooked food
In the second  method, it is the food that is "hit into pieces". Fish such as tuna or horse mackerel are chopped and mixed with garnishes such as garlic, ginger, green onions or  leaves. Soy sauce may be poured over the chopped mixture before consumption.

References

Cooking techniques
Japanese cuisine
Uncooked meat dishes